Nudaria is a genus of moths in the subfamily Arctiinae erected by Adrian Hardy Haworth in 1809.

Description
Palpi minute and porrect (extending forward). Antennae with large swollen basal joint. Tibia with short spurs. Forewings with long cell, veins 9 and 11 present, with vein 5 often comes from middle of discocellulars in male, but curved, if present. Hindwings with vein 3 from before angle of cell, vein 5 from above angle, veins 6 and 7 on a long stalk and vein 8 from near end of cell.

Species
 Nudaria albipunctella (Hampson, 1914) (South-East Asia)
 Nudaria diaphanella (Hampson, 1893) (from Sri Lanka)
 Nudaria discipuncta Hampson, 1898
 Nudaria fasciata Moore, 1878 (from India and Tibet)
 Nudaria fulvipicta Hampson, 1896
 Nudaria fumidisca Hampson, 1896
 Nudaria hirta Haworth, 1809
 Nudaria idalis Semper, 1899
 Nudaria margaritacea Walker, [1865] (from Tibet)
 Nudaria mesombra Hampson, 1918
 Nudaria mollis Lucas, 1894 (from Australia)
 Nudaria mundana (Linnaeus, 1761) – muslin footman
 Nudaria nanlingica Dubatolov, Kishida & M. Wang, 2012
 Nudaria phallustortens Holloway, 2001
 Nudaria punctata (Semper, 1899) (from the Philippines)
 Nudaria quilimanensis Strand, 1922 (from Mozambique)
 Nudaria quilimanicola Strand, 1922 (from Mozambique)
 Nudaria ranruna Matsumura, 1927 (from Taiwan)
 Nudaria squamifera (Hampson, 1914)
 Nudaria suffusa Hampson, 1894 (from India)
 Nudaria sundamollis Holloway, 2001 (from Borneo and Java)
 Nudaria unifascia (Inoue, 1980)
 Nudaria vernalis Dubatolov, Kishida & M. Wang, 2012

References

Witt, T. J. & Ronkay, L. (2011). "Lymantriinae and Arctiinae - Including Phylogeny and Check List of the Quadrifid Noctuoidea of Europe". Noctuidae Europaeae. 13: 1–448.

External links

Nudariina
Moth genera